Borexino is a particle physics experiment to study low energy (sub-MeV) solar neutrinos. The detector is the world's most radio-pure liquid scintillator calorimeter. It is placed within a stainless steel sphere which holds the photomultiplier tubes (PMTs) used as signal detectors and is shielded by a water tank to protect it against external radiation and tag incoming cosmic muons that manage to penetrate the overburden of the mountain above.

The primary aim of the experiment is to make a precise measurement of the individual neutrino fluxes from the Sun and compare them to the Standard solar model predictions. This will allow scientists to test and to further understand the functioning of the Sun (e.g.,  nuclear fusion processes taking place at the core of the Sun, solar composition, opacity, matter distribution, etc.) and will also help determine properties of neutrino oscillations, including the MSW effect. Specific goals of the experiment are to detect beryllium-7, boron-8, pp, pep and CNO solar neutrinos as well as anti-neutrinos from the Earth and nuclear power plants. The project may also be able to detect neutrinos from supernovae within our galaxy with a special potential to detect the elastic scattering of neutrinos onto protons, due to neutral current interactions. Borexino is a member of the Supernova Early Warning System. Searches for rare processes and potential unknown particles are also underway.

The name Borexino is the Italian diminutive of BOREX (Boron solar neutrino Experiment), after the original 1 kT-fiducial experimental proposal with a different scintillator (TMB), was discontinued because of a shift in focus in physics goals as well as financial constraints. The experiment is located at the Laboratori Nazionali del Gran Sasso near the town of L'Aquila, Italy, and is supported by an international collaboration with researchers from Italy, the United States, Germany, France, Poland, Russia and Ukraine.  The experiment is funded by multiple national agencies; the principal ones are INFN (National Institute for Nuclear Physics, Italy) and NSF (National Science Foundation, USA). In May 2017, Borexino reached 10 years of continuous operation since the start of its data-taking period in 2007.

The SOX experiment was a sub-project designed to study the possible existence of sterile neutrinos or other anomalous effects in neutrino oscillations at short ranges through the use of a neutrino generator based on radioactive cerium-144 placed right under the water tank of the Borexino detector. This project was cancelled in early 2018 due to insurmountable technical problems in the fabrication of the antineutrino source.

The entire Borexino experiment was ended in October 2021.

History and notable results 

The initial BOREX proposal was made in 1986.  In 1990, the design was fundamentally altered, and the name of the experiment was changed to "Borexino". Research and development began on the detector at that time. By 2004, the structure of the detector had been completed, and by May 2007 the detector chamber had been filled and data taking began.

The first results by the collaboration were published in August 2007 in: “First real time detection of 7Be solar neutrinos by Borexino”. The subject was further extended in 2008. In 2010, "geoneutrinos" from Earth's interior were observed for the first time using Borexino. These are anti-neutrinos produced in radioactive decays of uranium, thorium, potassium, and rubidium, although only the anti-neutrinos emitted in the 238U/232Th chains are visible because of the inverse beta decay reaction channel Borexino is sensitive to. That year, the lowest-threshold (3 MeV) measurement of the 8B solar neutrino flux was also published. Additionally, a multi-source detector calibration campaign took place, where several radioactive sources were inserted in the detector to study its response to known signals which are close to the expected ones to be studied. In 2011, the experiment published a precision measurement of the beryllium-7 neutrino flux, as well as the first evidence for the pep solar neutrinos.

The results of measurements of the speed of CERN Neutrinos to Gran Sasso were published in 2012. These results were consistent with the speed of light, thus providing confirmation that the Faster-than-light neutrino anomaly reported earlier in the year was an erroneous measurement. An extensive scintillator purification campaign was also performed, achieving the successful goal of further reducing the residual background radioactivity levels to unprecedented low amounts (up to 15 orders of magnitude under natural background radioactivity levels).

In 2013,  Borexino experiments added new limits on sterile neutrino parameters. They also extracted a signal of geoneutrinos, which gives insight into radioactive element activity in the earth's crust, a hitherto unclear field.

An analysis of the proton–proton fusion activity in the solar core, published in 2014, found that solar activity has been consistently stable on a 105-year scale. Once the phenomenon of neutrino oscillations, as described by MSW theory, is considered, the measurement of Borexino is consistent with the expectations from the standard solar model. This result provided significant data for understanding the functioning of the Sun. Previous experiments sensitive to low energy neutrinos (SAGE, Gallex, GNO) counted neutrinos above a certain energy, but did not measure  individual fluxes.

In 2015, an updated spectral analysis of geoneutrinos was presented.  Additionally, a Temperature Management and Monitoring System was installed in several phases throughout 2015, consisting of the multi-sensor Latitudinal Temperature Probe System (LTPS), whose testing and first-phase installation occurred in late 2014;  and the Thermal Insulation System (TIS) that minimized the thermal influence of the exterior environment on the interior fluids through the extensive insulation of the experiment's external walls. Later in 2015, Borexino also yielded the best available limit to the lifetime of the electron (via e−→γ+ν decay), providing the most stringent confirmation of charge conservation to date.

In 2017, Borexino provided the first wideband spectroscopic measurement of the solar ν spectrum, featuring the simultaneous and most precise measurements available of the 7Be, pep and pp neutrino fluxes, furthermore extracted from a single extended energy window (190-2930 keV). These measurements reached a precision of up to 2.7% (in the case of the beryllium solar neutrinos) and established a 5σ confirmation of the presence of pep neutrinos. The limit on the long sought-after CNO neutrinos was kept at the same significance level as in previous Borexino results, which hold the best limit so far, but with weaker assumptions, making the result more robust. Much enlarged statistics thanks to the extra years of exposure, as well as renewed analysis techniques and MonteCarlo state-of-the-art simulations of the whole detector and its physical processes were instrumental in this result. Additionally, an updated observation of 8B neutrinos was published with Phase I and II data (2008-2016), improving precision to around twice that of the previous measurement of this solar component, and hinting at a slight favoring of the high-metallicity SSMs with the available solar neutrino data. An improvement in the sensitivity to the seasonal modulation of the solar neutrino signal was also reported in 2017. That same year, the best direct-observation limit available for the neutrino magnetic moment was established by Borexino too. A neutrino signal related to the GW150914, GW151226 and GW170104 gravitational wave observations was rejected to within Borexino's sensitivity, as expected.

In 2020 Borexino detected the first deep solar core CNO Neutrinos.

SOX project 

The SOX experiment aimed at the complete confirmation or at a clear disproof of the so-called neutrino anomalies, a set of circumstantial evidences of electron neutrino disappearance observed at LSND, MiniBooNE, with nuclear reactors and with solar neutrino Gallium detectors (GALLEX/GNO, SAGE). If successful, SOX would demonstrate the existence of sterile neutrino components and open a brand new era in fundamental particle physics and cosmology. A solid signal would mean the discovery of the first particles beyond the Standard Electroweak Model and would have profound implications in our understanding of the Universe and of fundamental particle physics. In case of a negative result, it would be able to close a long-standing debate about the reality of the neutrino anomalies, would probe the existence of new physics in low energy neutrino interactions, would provide a measurement of neutrino magnetic moment, Weinberg angle and other basic physical parameters; and would yield a superb energy calibration for Borexino which will be very beneficial for future high-precision solar neutrino measurements.

SOX was envisioned to use a powerful (≈150 kCi) and innovative antineutrino generator made of Ce-144/Pr-144 and possibly a later Cr-51 neutrino generator, which would require a much shorter data-taking campaign. These generators would be located at short distance (8.5 m) from the Borexino detector -under it, in fact: in a pit built ex-profeso before the detector was erected, with the idea it could be used for the insertion of such radioactive sources- and would yield tens of thousands of clean neutrino interactions in the internal volume of the Borexino detector. A high precision (<1% uncertainty) twin-calorimetry campaign would be carried out before deployment in the pit, at the end of data-taking and possibly at some point during the experimental run, in order to provide an independent precise measurement of the source's activity, in order to accomplish a low-uncertainty rate analysis. Shape analyses for the source's antineutrino signal have also been developed in order to increase the experiment's sensitivity, covering the whole high-significance "anomaly" phase space that is still left where light sterile neutrinos could lie in.

SOX cancelled 
The experiment was expected to start in the first half of 2018 and take data for about two years. In October 2017, an end-to-end "blank" (without radioactive material) transport test was carried out successfully at the Borexino site in LNGS, in order to clear out final regulatory permissions for the start of the experiment, ahead of the arrival of the source. The cerium oxide (ceria, or CeO2) source for CeSOX's antineutrino generator had to be manufactured by Mayak PA, but technical problems during the fabrication were disclosed in late 2017. These problems meant the generator would not be able to provide the necessary amount of antineutrinos, by a factor of 3, and prompted a review of the project and its eventual starting date. By early February 2018, the CeSOX project was officially cancelled by CEA and INFN due to the radioactive source production problem, and Borexino's 2018-19 goals were reoriented toward achieving higher detector stability and, with it, increased radiopurity, in order to push for higher precision solar neutrino results, with special emphasis on CNO neutrinos.

References

External links

Official website
Borexino Genova homepage
Record for Borexino experiment on INSPIRE-HEP

Neutrino observatories
Research institutes in Italy
Particle experiments